Mount Nanhu is a mountain in Taroko National Park, Heping District, Taichung, Taiwan with an elevation of 3,742 m (12,277 ft). It is the 5th highest mountain in Taiwan.

Nanhu Salamander (Hynobius glacialis) is a rare salamander that was first described from this mountain.

See also
 100 Peaks of Taiwan
 List of mountains in Taiwan

References

Landforms of Taichung
Nanhu